Kabir Duhan Singh (born 8 September 1986 in Gohana, Haryana) is an Indian actor, who appears in Telugu, Kannada, and Tamil language films. After making his debut in the Telugu film Jil (2015), Kabir has carved out a career as an antagonist in Tollywood. He has also appeared in Sardaar Gabbar Singh.

Personal life 
Kabir Duhan Singh is a Haryanvi Jat of Duhan clan. Born and brought up in Faridabad in Haryana, he moved to Mumbai in 2011 and took up modelling as a career. He took up many a Fashion Week assignment and participated in international shows. His foray into acting was with a Hindi film starring Shiney Ahuja which was subsequently shelved.

Career 
Born and brought up in Gohana, Kabir Duhan Singh moved to Mumbai in 2011 and took up modelling as a career. He took up many a Fashion Week assignments and participated in international work as a part of his occupation. His first foray into acting was a part of a Hindi film project starring Shiney Ahuja, but the film was subsequently shelved. Eager to make a career in films, he became a stage actor and then successfully auditioned to be a part of the Telugu film Jil (2015), whose makers had been looking for an antagonist with a North Indian background. The film subsequently won him positive reviews, while his follow up in Kick 2 (2015) was equally appreciated. In order to maintain the high quality of his acting roles, Kabir chose to carefully analyse his characters before committing to roles and turned down other ventures which would have seen him portray the protagonist as well as a role in Bengal Tiger (2015). The actor then made his debut in Tamil films by portraying a villain in Siva's revenge drama Vedalam (2015), which had Ajith Kumar in the lead role.

Following the success of his initial films, Kabir began working on several Telugu films at the same time including Dictator and Sardaar Gabbar Singh, and was reported to be the "busiest baddie in Southern filmdom".

Filmography

References

External links 
 

Living people
1986 births
21st-century Indian male actors
Male actors in Telugu cinema
Male actors in Kannada cinema
People from Faridabad
Male actors from Haryana
Indian Sikhs